XPRESS  was launched in the UAE on 15 March 2007 as a free weekly newspaper and competitor to the likes of 7DAYS and Emirates Today. XPRESS was set up as a multicultural community paper for all UAE residents, both UAE nationals and expatriates.
The magazine, published in Dubai by the Al Nisr Group as a sister paper to Gulf News, covers news, leisure and entertainment and sports, with an emphasis on the local.

Development and launch
Work on XPRESS – then known as Project X – began in the basement of the Gulf News offices off Sheikh Zayed Road near Safa Park in early 2005. Rumours of the secret project began to leak into the UAE media industry over the next few months, but the details of the publication – including its name – remained a closely guarded secret until its launch was announced on 12 March 2007.

Initial media reports indicated that Al Nisr Media intended to publish XPRESS twice weekly, and hoped to obtain a licence to publish daily.

However, by the time it launched, XPRESS itself confirmed it would be published once a week, on Thursdays. The publishers have not confirmed whether they intend to seek a daily licence from the Dubai authorities.

The newspaper was designed by Mario Garcia, president of the Tampa-based Garcia Media, who described it as "a vibrant, contemporary newspaper totally created for the reader of the 'always on' culture".

Reception from Dubai's media circle to the inaugural issue was mixed, with one pundit describing it as "a headache on every page" and accusing it of running parochial stories. However, the same reporter praised the new paper's dedication to printing original stories and said it helped fulfill a growing desire for local news in fast-growing Dubai.

Since 2009 Xpress has been reduced in pages, and has let a number of staff go. As part of its downsizing, its own dedicated website was absorbed by Gulf News.

In March 2013, XPRESS launched an Abu Dhabi edition.

Mazhar Farooqui is the editor for both editions.

Distribution
Al Nisr Media print between 80,000 and 100,000 copies of XPRESS for distribution every Thursday.

The primary means of distribution are newspaper stands in many of Dubai's petrol stations, with others in apartment block foyers and malls. Subscribers to XPRESS'''s sister paper, the paid-for Gulf News'', have copies delivered to their homes on a Thursday or Friday.

References

External links
XPRESS

2007 establishments in the United Arab Emirates
English-language newspapers published in the United Arab Emirates
Mass media in Dubai
Newspapers published in the United Arab Emirates
Publications established in 2007